Trifurcula pallidella is a moth of the family Nepticulidae. It is the type species of the genus Trifurcula. It is found from south-eastern Germany (Bayern), east into Bohemia, Moravia, Slovakia, adjacent south-eastern Poland, much of Austria, both along the Danube and east and south of the Alps, extending through the Balkans to southern Greece (Peloponnesus) and Crete, eastwards through Ukraine and Russia to the Volga, and one questionable record from Turkey. To the west it occurs in northern Italy almost reaching France, just extending into Switzerland (Ticino), and throughout Italy to Sicily and Corsica.

The wingspan is 7.5–9 mm. Adults are on wing from May to early or mid-July. There is one generation per year.

The larvae feed on Chamaecytisus albus, Chamaecytisus austriacus, Chamaecytisus hirsutus, Chamaecytisus ratisbonensis, Chamaecytisus ruthenicus, Cytisus procumbens and Lembotropis nigricans. The larvae make galls on their host plant. The egg is deposited on the stem where later the gall forms and is usually difficult to see. The larva first bores into the parenchyma and then feeds in a spiral gallery around the stem, successively moving upwards, also partly boring in the central woody part of the stem. The stem is thickened more or less considerably by the larval activity. The frass is deposited in the gallery, almost filling it. Pupation takes place outside of the gall.

External links
Trifurcula pallidella (Duponchel, 1843) (Nepticulidae): distribution, biology and immature stages, particularly in Poland
Fauna Europaea

Nepticulidae
Moths of Europe
Moths described in 1843